Master Gunnery Sergeant (MGySgt) is the 9th and highest enlisted grade in the United States Marine Corps. Master Gunnery Sergeants are senior staff non-commissioned officers (SNCOs) with the pay grade of E-9, equivalent to Sergeants Major and the Sergeant Major of the Marine Corps (though the latter is a single unique billet in the Corps, and is senior to all enlisted ranks).

Master Gunnery Sergeants are sometimes referred to by the nicknames "Master Guns" or "Master Gunny". These nicknames are considered unacceptable in formal or ceremonial situations and, at the rank holder's discretion, may also be unacceptable for use by lower-ranking Marines. 

The Master Gunnery Sergeant insignia consists of a bursting bomb centered vertically between three chevrons and four rockers.

History
The grade was derived from another grade unique to the United States Marine Corps, the Gunnery Sergeant, and has been in use (though not continuously) since the time of the Spanish–American War (April 25 – August 12, 1898).

Establishment of the grade in its current form and pay grade occurred during a sweeping reorganization of grades in 1958 and 1959. The grade was included, along with the grade of Master Sergeant, in a new career path for the pay grades of E-8 and E-9 which allowed senior SNCO billets to be filled by occupational specialists. This move was designed to officially acknowledge the ever-increasing complexity of modern warfare, while still keeping the First Sergeant and Sergeant Major career paths with their historic command emphasis intact. (During and prior to World War II, this was reversed; the Sergeant Major at the time was an administrative position while the Master Gunnery Sergeant was part of the S-3 section and enforced discipline.)

Modern role
Master Gunnery Sergeants (MGySgts) with an infantry Military Occupational Specialty (MOS) serve in the billet of operations chief, as the senior staff non-commissioned officer in the operations section of an infantry battalion, or higher level (e.g., MEU, infantry regiment, MEB, Marine division, or MEF) headquarters. MGySgts with a non-infantry (e.g., artillery, tank, communications, logistics) MOS typically serve as either the operations chief of their MOS type battalion/regiment (e.g., artillery battalion/regiment, tank battalion) or as the section chief/NCOIC in their MOS related staff section (e.g., communications, logistics) at the regimental/Marine Aircraft Group, or higher level, headquarters. Master Gunnery Sergeants with the Military Police MOS serve in the billet of Provost Sergeant in the Provost Marshal's Office.

Master Gunnery Sergeants with an aviation maintenance MOS serve in the billet of maintenance NCOIC/chief in the aircraft maintenance department of a Marine aircraft squadron or in maintenance-related billets at the Marine Air Group (MAG) or Marine Air Wing (MAW) level. For example, there are four aviation-related MGySgt billets (aircraft maintenance NCOIC, aviation supply NCOIC, avionics NCOIC, and aviation ordnance NCOIC) in the Marine Aviation Logistics Squadron (MALS) organic to each Marine Aircraft Group (MAG).

In their annual performance evaluations, called "fitness reports", eligible Gunnery Sergeants indicate whether they wish to be considered for promotion to Master Sergeant or First Sergeant, and thus whether they enter the promotional track for Master Gunnery Sergeant or Sergeant Major. Once promoted, the promotional track is usually permanent, with lateral movement between the two programs very uncommon. 

One of the major differences between the two E-9 ranks is that Master Gunnery Sergeants retain an occupational field-related MOS, while Sergeants Major receive a new MOS to reflect their specific command-related focus. This reinforces the Master Gunnery Sergeant's role as a provider of military leadership, technical acumen, and mastery of their MOS. It is also important to note that while a Sergeant Major and a Master Gunnery Sergeant have different duties and responsibilities, a Master Gunnery Sergeant can (and often does) assume the duties of a Sergeant Major. The reverse is rarely possible.

See also
 Comparative military ranks
 Gunnery Sergeant
 Military rank
 Sergeant
 United States Marine Corps rank insignia

References

United States military enlisted ranks
Military ranks of the United States Marine Corps